The following is a list of medalists at the 1964 Summer Olympics, held in Tokyo, from 10 to 24 October 1964.

Athletics

Men's events

Women's events

Basketball

Boxing

Canoeing

Men's events

Women's events

Cycling

Road cycling

Track cycling

Diving

Men

Women

Equestrian

Fencing

Men's events

Women's events

Field hockey

Football (Soccer)

Gymnastics

Men's events

Women's

Judo

Modern pentathlon

Rowing

Sailing

Shooting

Swimming

Men's events

Women's events

Volleyball

Water polo

Weightlifting

Wrestling

Greco-Roman

Freestyle

See also
 1964 Summer Olympics medal table

External links

Medalists
1964